The Texas A&M–Kingsville Javelinas football program is the intercollegiate American football team for the Texas A&M University–Kingsville located in the U.S. state of Texas. The team competes in the Division II and is a member of the Lone Star Conference. The school's first football team was fielded in 1929. The team plays its home games at the 15,000-seat Javelina Stadium.

History
In 1929, the school joined the original Texas Intercollegiate Athletic Association. By the time that TIAA folded, the "Fighting Javelinas" had won two football championships. Following this, the school competed independently for several years. They moved from competing with junior colleges and teachers colleges to competing against larger schools throughout the state. One highlight of this period included a football game that pitted the Javelinas against the Aggies of Texas A&M at Kyle Field in College Station. The Javelinas led the game until the Aggies tied the game at 14 with three minutes left to play. The game ended in a tie. However, the Javelinas demonstrated that they could hold their own with a large football powerhouse. This further substantiated the team's nickname as "the toughest little team in the nation."

In 1934, the school participated in the Lone Star Conference on a probationary period. In 1935, the school joined the Alamo Conference. By 1937, the Javelinas captured their first Alamo Conference co-championship (with St. Mary's). The next year, the Javelinas won their first outright Alamo Conference football championship. This led to a string of football championships and the school's recognition as a football powerhouse.

For the 1954 season, A&I was finally inducted into the Lone Star Conference (LSC). By 1959, the Javelinas won the first in a long string of LSC championships. Since then, the school has remained a perennial conference powerhouse, winning 27 championships. During the years that the Lone Star Conference was a member of the National Association of Intercollegiate Athletics (NAIA), the Javelinas also picked up seven national championships. During the decade of the 1970s, the Javelinas won five NAIA national championships and went undefeated from the last game of 1973 through third game of 1977.

After the Lone Star Conference joined the National Collegiate Athletic Association's Division II in 1980, the Javelinas continued their conference, regional, and national success. The school changed its name from Texas A&I to Texas A&M-Kingsville in 1993. One year later, the Javelinas played in the 1994 NCAA Division II National Football Championship, only to lose to the University of North Alabama 16–10. The school has been in NCAA Division II since 1980, after being in the NAIA from 1955–1980.

Notable former players

Notable alumni include:

 Johnny Bailey
 Earl Dotson
 Karl Douglas
 Mike Dyal
 Donovan Gans
 Roberto Garza
 Darrell Green (Hall of Famer)
 James Guidry
 Al Harris
 Dwight Harrison
 James Jefferson
 Randy Johnson
 John Randle (Hall of Famer)
 Heath Sherman
 Gene Upshaw (Hall of Famer)
 Karl Williams

Championships
While known as Texas A&I, the Javelinas won seven NAIA titles.

Bowl games

Conference championships
The Javelinas have won 33 conference titles since 1936. They have also won seven Lone Star South Division titles (1997, 1998, 2001, 2002, 2003, 2004, 2009).

1936: Alamo Conference Co-champions (1–1–0)
1937: Alamo Conference Co-champions (Unknown record)
1938: Alamo Conference Champions (2-0)
1939: Alamo Conference Co-champions (1–0–1)
1951: Texas Collegiate Athletic Conference Co-champions (3–0–1)
1953: Texas Collegiate Athletic Conference Co-champions (3–0–1)
1959: Lone Star Conference Co-champions (5–2–0)
1960: Lone Star Conference Champions (6–0–1)
1962: Lone Star Conference Champions (6–0–1)
1967: Lone Star Conference Champions (7–0–0)
1968: Lone Star Conference Champions (7–1–0)
1969: Lone Star Conference Co-champions (7–1–0)
1970: Lone Star Conference Champions (8–1–0)
1974: Lone Star Conference Champions (9–0–0)
1975: Lone Star Conference Champions (9–0–0)
1976: Lone Star Conference Champions (7–0–0)
1977: Lone Star Conference Co-champions (5–1–1)
1979: Lone Star Conference Champions (6–1–0)
1985: Lone Star Conference Champions (5–0–0)
1987: Lone Star Conference Co-champions (4–1–1)
1988: Lone Star Conference Champions (6–1–0)
1989: Lone Star Conference Champions (7–0–0)
1992: Lone Star Conference Champions (6–0–0)
1993: Lone Star Conference Champions (5–0–0)
1994: Lone Star Conference Champions (5–0–0)
1995: Lone Star Conference Champions (7–0–0)
1996: Lone Star Conference Champions (7–0)
1997: Lone Star Conference Champions (9–0)
2001: Lone Star Conference Co-champions (5–1)
2002: Lone Star Conference Champions (5–1)
2003: Lone Star Conference Champions (8–0)
2004: Lone Star Conference Champions (8–1)
2009: Lone Star Conference Co-champions (7–2)

List of head coaches
From 1942 to 1945, the Javelina had no team due to World War II. Gil Steinke has the most victories coached as a Javelina. Steinke and Ron Harms are both in the College Football Hall of Fame.

 Lewis J. Smith (1925–1928): 16–10–1
 Bud McCallum (1929–1939, 1941): 65–31–9
 Dewey Mayhew (1940, 1946–1953): 46–38–1
 Gil Steinke (1954–1976): 182–61–4
 Fred Jonas (1977–1978): 14–6–1
 Ron Harms (1979–1999): 169–75
 Richard Cundiff (2000–2006): 52–28
 Bo Atterberry (2007–2012): 41–28
 David Calloway (2013–2014): 4–17
 Daren Wilkinson (2015–2019): 19–26
 Mike Salinas (2020–present): 0–0

Conference history
 1925–1929: Independent
 1930-1930: Texas Intercollegiate Athletic Association
 1931–1938: Independent
 1939–1940: Alamo Conference
 1941–1948: Independent
 1949–1953: Texas Collegiate Athletic Conference
 1954–present: Lone Star Conference

References

External links
 

 
American football teams established in 1929
1929 establishments in Texas